Cotroceni is a neighbourhood in western Bucharest, Romania located around the Cotroceni hill, in Bucharest's Sector 5.

The nearest Metro stations are Eroilor, Academia Militară, and Politehnica.

History
The Hill of Cotroceni was once covered by the forest of Vlăsia, which covered most of today's Bucharest. Here, in 1679 a monastery was built by Șerban Cantacuzino, later to be transformed into a palace in 1888 by King Carol I. Houses were built in the area near the palace by the royal servants and by high-ranking military personnel. 

Carol I also build a royal train station named  near the palace. The train station was relocated by the communist regime and was later used for transporting materials for the construction of Casa Poporului.

Notable people
Important Romanian figures who lived in this neighborhood: Ion Barbu, Nicolae Herlea, Ion Minulescu, Marin Preda, and Liviu Rebreanu.

Landmarks 
 Cotroceni Palace, the official residence of the President of Romania, is located in this neighbourhood
 Bucharest Botanical Garden 
 Carol Davila University of Medicine and Pharmacy
 The Bucharest Opera building
 
 New St. Eleftherios Church
 
 Casa Radio

Gallery

References

Districts of Bucharest
Hills of Bucharest